Sam Ratulangi International Airport , is located in North Sulawesi,  northeast of Manado. The airport is named after the Minahasan educator and independence hero Sam Ratulangi (1890–1949). It is designated as one of the 11 main entry ports to Indonesia by the Ministry of Tourism and Culture of Indonesia and serves as the main gateway to the Bunaken National Marine Park. It is currently the operating base of Lion Air/Wings Air for the northeastern part of Indonesia and is one of the focus cities of Garuda Indonesia and Citilink. This airport is also serving several international destinations.

History

Sam Ratulangi Airport was originally built by the Japanese in 1942 with a runway length of 700 meters and width of 23 meters and it was named Mapanget Airfield. When the Permesta (People's Movement) rebellion occurred, central government troops renamed this airport as Tugiman Airfield to commemorate Sergeant Major Tugiman, a soldier who died while fighting on Mapanget.

The airport was renamed to Mapanget Airfield because its existence at that time in Wanua Mapanget, Onderdistik Tatelu. Over time, there was a change in the mention of this airport into A. A. Maramis Airfield, as it was used as the name of the highway from the airport to Manado.

Finally, the airfield was renamed after Minahasan educator and revolutionary Sam Ratulangi.

In 1994 the airport was classified as class 1B and the runway was extended to 2,650 meters long and 45 meters wide. With the expansion of this runway, the airport could accommodate larger aircraft types, like Airbus A300, Airbus A320 and DC-10.

As the government's efforts to develop the airport in 1990, Sam Ratulangi Airport is managed by PT. Angkasa Pura I (Persero) as a State-Owned Enterprise (SOE). With the aim to build the economy, providing low in expediting air transportation facilities. In an effort to anticipate the needs of air transport, so that made the development of Sam Ratulangi Airport Manado to build the airport facility development projects undertaken by Fasilitas Bandar Udara dan Keselamatan Penerbangan (FBUKP) and operated since end of 2000. The handover was taken operationally from DGCA to PT. Angkasa Pura I (Persero) on 18 December 2003.

Facilities

Cargo facilities
The 3,546 m2 cargo terminal has an annual capacity of 7,840 tonnes (17,284,000 lbs), a 2,280 m2 (24,541 sq ft) warehouse, a bonded warehouse, a transit zone, a Free Port/Foreign Trade Zone, an EU border post, aircraft maintenance, mechanical handling, an animal quarantine, fresh meat inspection, livestock handling, health officials, security for valuables, dangerous goods, radioactive goods, very large/heavy cargo, and an express/courier center.

Upgrades

Construction began in 1998. In 2001, the new terminal opened featuring 21 check-in counters, 5 gates, 4 airbridges, 2 baggage claim belts and an outdoor waving gallery on top of the 3-story terminal building. Its 4,044 m2 international passenger terminal may serve up to 183,000 passengers annually while the 14,126 m2 domestic passenger terminal serves up to 1,3 million passengers/year. During peak hours the terminal may serve up to 2,816 passengers simultaneously. The 54,300 m2 apron can hold up to 4 wide body aircraft and 11 medium and small body aircraft.

A minor upgrade had been done prior to the World Ocean Conference and Coral Triangle Initiative Summit in May 2009. It was done in the area of the apron, international boarding lounge, CIP room and car parking lot. The apron currently has an area of 71,992 m2 while the parking lot is available for 500 cars. The waiting lounge and gate for international departure and arrival are being expanded together with an additional aerobridge installation.

The terminal itself was upgraded from 26 thousands square meters to 56 thousands square meters. This project was officially finished in 2022, which makes the airport capable of serving 5.7 million passengers annually.

Airlines and destinations

Passenger

Ground transportation

Taxi
Plenty of metered-taxis such as Bluebird standby at the airport until the last flight of the day arrives.

Bus
Perum DAMRI operates buses from the airport to the city.

Statistics

Source : North Sulawesi Government Office of Transportation, Communication, and Information Systems

Accidents and incidents
 16 February 1967 – Garuda Indonesia Flight 708, UPG-MDC, Lockheed L-188C Electra (PK-GLB), 22 of 84 passengers were killed (no fatalities among the eight crew members). Flight 708 departed Jakarta at 00:30 GMT on 15 February for a flight to Manado via Surabaya and Makassar. On the second leg of the flight, bad weather in Makassar forced the crew to return to Surabaya. The flight continued the next day to Makassar and on to Manado. The cloud base in Manado was 900 feet with two kilometer visibility. An approach to runway 18 was made, but after passing a hill 200 feet above runway elevation and 2720 feet short of the threshold, the pilot realised he was too high and left of the centreline. The nose was lowered and the aircraft banked right to intercept the glide path. The speed decreased below the 125 knots target threshold speed and the aircraft – still banked to the right – landed heavily 156 feet short of the runway threshold. The undercarriage collapsed and the aircraft skidded and caught fire.
 1974 – Douglas C-47A PK-ZDF of was written off in an accident. Date is variously reported as 4 April 6 April or 4 June.
 7 January 1976 – Mandala Airlines, Vickers 806 Viscount (PK-RVK), no fatalities. Landing in slight intermittent rain, the aircraft touched down 520 meters down the runway. The aircraft overran the runway, crossed a ditch and three drains before coming to rest 180 meters past the end of the runway.
 10 December 1982 – Bouraq Indonesia Airlines, Hawker Siddeley HS-748 (PK-IHI), no fatalities. The nose landing gear collapsed on landing, causing the aircraft to veer off the runway.
 3 October 1986 – East Indonesia Air Taxi, MAL-MDC, Shorts SC.7 Skyvan (PK-ESC), all 10 passengers and 3 crew members were killed. Struck a mountain.
 9 May 1991 – Merpati Nusantara Airlines 7533, TTE-MDC, Fokker F-27 Friendship (PK-MFD), all eight passengers and five crew members were killed when the aircraft crashed into a mountain.
On 1 January 2007, Adam Air Flight 574 was nearing Sulawesi, coming to Manado Airport from Juanda International Airport. The pilots of the Boeing 737-400 flew off course when their navigation system failed, eventually entering a storm near the island where they became spatially disoriented. The flight spiraled downwards rapidly and broke up, leading to the death of all 102 people on board.

References

External links
 Sam Ratulangi International Airport official website
 NACO Airport Consultants: Preparation of master plans and implementation of the first development stages at Sam Ratulangi International airport (1994–2003)

Manado
Airports in North Sulawesi